Tiguipa Airport  is a public use airport serving the town of Tigüipa in the Tarija Department of Bolivia.

See also

Transport in Bolivia
List of airports in Bolivia

References

External links 
OpenStreetMap - Tigüipa
OurAirports - Tiguipa
Fallingrain - Tiguipa Airport

Airports in Tarija Department